Cobra and Phases Group Play Voltage in the Milky Night is the sixth studio album by English-French rock band Stereolab. It was released on 21 September 1999 and was issued by Duophonic Records and Elektra Records. The album was largely co-produced by Stereolab, John McEntire, and Jim O'Rourke.

Recording
Stereolab produced Cobra and Phases Group Play Voltage in the Milky Night with John McEntire, who had co-produced the band's previous two studio albums Emperor Tomato Ketchup (1996) and Dots and Loops (1997), and Jim O'Rourke. Assisted by McEntire and O'Rourke, Stereolab recorded the bulk of Cobra and Phases Group between November 1998 and February 1999, at Wolf Studios in London. As band members Tim Gane and Lætitia Sadier were occupied with raising their infant son at the time, Stereolab opted to record in London instead of Chicago, where McEntire and O'Rourke were typically based. The only material on the album that does not date to these sessions is one section of the song "Italian Shoes Continuum"; this section was produced by Stereolab and Fulton Dingley and recorded in February 1998 at Blackwing Studios in London.

Release
Cobra and Phases Group was released on 21 September 1999 in the United States by Elektra Records, and on 27 September 1999 in the United Kingdom by Duophonic Records. The track "The Free Design" was previously released on 6 September 1999; it was issued as a single (on 7" vinyl) and as an EP (on CD and 12" vinyl).

A remastered and expanded edition of Cobra and Phases Group was released by Duophonic and Warp on 13 September 2019. Coinciding with the re-release, "Come and Play in the Milky Night" was issued as a digital single on 5 September 2019.

Critical reception and legacy

Cobra and Phases Group was released to middling reviews from music critics. Pitchforks Brent DiCrescenzo wrote that Stereolab's "socialist cocktail jazz schtick" had become predictable and "soulless", and that despite the album's eclectic nature, "it all sounds exactly the same." NME writer Johnny Cigarettes stated that the music was reminiscent of "bad jazz and progressive rock" and scathingly accused Stereolab of "borrowing credibility by indulgently showing off their stylistic dexterity, thinking that odd time signatures and weird sounds are clever in their own right, [and] being deliberately obscure and unlistenable". James Hunter of Rolling Stone dismissed the first five songs as uneventful and felt that only from "Infinity Girl" onward does the album capture the band's "fashionable post-rock charm". Barry Walters of Spin found the more drone-oriented songs tepid but noted that "the melodic bits are dreamier than ever", concluding that the album would benefit from "ruthless home-listener editing".

Among more positive appraisals, Alternative Press remarked that "few bands make sweetly psychedelic pop as enduring as [Stereolab] do." USA Today critic Edna Gundersen said that although "ponderous drones such as 'Blue Milk' border on grating, the aggressively unorthodox band lapses into coherent melodies as effortlessly as Burt Bacharach." Elisabeth Vincentelli of Entertainment Weekly wrote that the album "takes time to work its charm, but it's well worth the effort."

In a retrospective review for AllMusic, Tim Sendra stated that while "difficult at times, Cobra is Stereolab at their near best", effectively balancing the band's experimental and pop sensibilities. Reviewing the album in 2019 for Uncut, Louis Pattison commented that in hindsight, "its charms are more evident". The same year, Tim Gane cited Cobra and Phases Group and its follow-up Sound-Dust (2001) as his favourite Stereolab albums in an interview with The Guardian: "I like things that are sprawling and not identified really easily, not easy to digest but there's a lot of possibilities in them."

Track listing

Personnel
Credits are adapted from the album's liner notes.

Stereolab
 Stereolab – vocals, guitar, organ, electronics, drums, percussion, bass, electric harpsichord, clavinet, Wurlitzer piano, tack piano
 Tim Gane
 Lætitia Sadier
 Mary Hansen
 Morgane Lhote
 Andy Ramsay

Additional musicians

 Mark Bassey – brass
 Colin Crawley – brass
 Sophie Harris – strings
 William Hawkes – strings
 Kev Hopper – saw on "Puncture in the Radax Permutation" and "Caleidoscopic Gaze"
 Simon Johns – bass
 Rob Mazurek – cornet on "Fuses", "People Do It All the Time", "Infinity Girl", "Op Hop Detonation", and "Strobo Acceleration"
 John McEntire – vibraphone, keyboards, drums
 Dominic Murcott – vibraphone and marimba on "The Spiracles", "Puncture in the Radax Permutation", "Caleidoscopic Gaze", and "The Emergency Kisses"
 Jacqueline Norrie – strings
 Sean O'Hagan – organ, electric harpsichord, clavinet, bass, acoustic guitar, tack piano, brass arrangements
 Jim O'Rourke – bass, guitar, keyboards, percussion, string arrangements
 Andy Robinson – brass
 Steve Waterman – brass
 Brian G. Wright – strings

Production

 Fulton Dingley – production, mixing, and recording on "Italian Shoes Continuum"
 John McEntire – production, mixing, recording
 Jim O'Rourke – production, mixing, recording
 Steve Rooke – mastering
 Stereolab (credited as "The Groop") – production

Design
 House – design

Charts

References

External links
 Cobra and Phases Group Play Voltage in the Milky Night at official Stereolab website
 
 

1999 albums
Stereolab albums
Albums produced by John McEntire
Albums produced by Jim O'Rourke (musician)
Elektra Records albums